Bernd Ruf (born 27 September 1964 in Offenburg) is a German conductor and clarinettist. In 2004, Ruf was appointed a new professorship in popular music, jazz, and world music at the Lübeck University of Music.

Life and works 
Bernd Ruf grew up in Gengenbach, Baden-Württemberg in a musical environment of classical and popular music. During his final two years of school he attended a two-year extracurricular conducting course. After his Abitur, he studied school music, diploma in music education, jazz and popular music, music director and musicology in Stuttgart and Frankfurt. Following his musical director degree, Bernd Ruf conducted musicals (Miss Saigon, Les Misérables, Dance of the Vampires, Disney's Beauty and the Beast, The Lion King), assisted Dennis Russell Davies at the Stuttgart Chamber Orchestra and at the Salzburg Festival, and undertook the conception and direction of youth concerts at the Stuttgarter Philharmoniker from 1999 to 2004.

As a freelance director, he developed the Crossover Symphony series: orchestral programs with African, Asian, and Latin American musicians in cooperation with jazz and rock musicians. He has conducted several premieres in Stuttgart with the Stuttgart Chamber Orchestra and in New York with the German-American Chamber Orchestra for composer and violinist Gregor Hübner. He has appeared as a guest with SWR Rundfunkorchester Kaiserslautern, the NDR Radiophilharmonie Hanover, and the Bochumer Symphoniker.

Ruf is a guest conductor with the Staatskapelle Halle, the Jenaer Philharmonie, and the Württembergische Philharmonie Reutlingen. He has worked with Jon Lord, Roger Hodgson, Ian Anderson, Paul McCartney, Randy Brecker, Joe Lovano, and Charlie Mariano on his orchestral crossover projects. He is responsible for organizing and conducting the annual open-air event Bridges to the Classics at the Handel Festival in Halle. He has led the German Pops Orchestra and the European Art Orchestra as music director since 1999. Both orchestras have made an international name for themselves with their studio recordings and regularly perform classical, crossover, film, and pop productions for international record labels. He conducts  orchestral soundtracks for cinema, television, and games (The Settlers, Anno, SpellForce, Paraworld, Battleforge, Darksiders, House of the Lion).

As a clarinettist he draws on influences from klezmer, jazz, southeastern European folk music, and classical music. Improvisation is a major part of his music. In 1987 Ruf joined the ensemble Tango Five (de), which was founded two years previously in Ravensburg. The members of this ensemble have remained constant since 1995: Gregor Hübner (violin), Veit Hübner (double bass), Karl Albrecht Fischer (piano), and Bernd Ruf (clarinet). Numerous tours have taken the ensemble as far afield as the United States, South America, Georgia, and throughout Europe. On one hand, Tango Five plays scenic musical comedy programs in which four musicians tell short, ironic stories using different instruments and a cappella vocals to bridge musical genres. On the other hand, Tango Five plays a repertoire with its roots in southeastern European folk music, klezmer, gypsy, tango, classical music, and jazz.

The cooperation between Tango Five and bandoneonist Raul Jaurena began in 1998 with the album Obsecion. Appearances at tango festivals in Montevideo and Buenos Aires followed. One year later Bernd Ruf wrote and conducted his first Crossover Symphony for the ORF Radio-Symphonie Orchester of Vienna: Latin Symphony in which Jaurena gave his debut performance with a European orchestra as bandoneon soloist. Other tours followed, the Symphonic Tango Night with the Stuttgart Philharmonic Orchestra (de) and the tango evening 'Amando a Buenos Aires', which was performed for several weeks in Stuttgart's Friedrichsbau. Furthermore, Bernd Ruf and Raul Jaurena have performed as a duo under the name JAURENA RUF Project since 2007.

Since 2004 Ruf has headed the field of popular music, jazz, and world music at the Lübeck Academy of Music, of which he became vice president in May 2011. There he developed the 'Lübeck model', in which jazz and pop are not taught as an independent degree course, but rather as an integral component of classical degree courses. During the 2006 winter semester he temporarily took over the running of the Institute of School Music; since the 2008 winter semester he is now acting head of this institute.

Awards and honors 
 1991: Ravensburger Kupferle (cabaret award) for Tango Five
 1992: Kleinkunstpreis Baden-Württemberg (3rd place) for Tango Five
 1995: Scholarship from the Herbert von Karajan Foundation
 1999: Scholarship from Kunststiftung Baden-Württemberg
 2002: Grammy nomination as a conductor in the Best Classical Crossover Album category for the album Paquito D'Rivera – The Clarinettist

Discography

See also
 Australian Brandenburg Orchestra
 Kammerorchester Basel
 Philharmonia Virtuosi
 Sodagreen

References 
 Ruf, Bernd. Miss Saigon in Lübbes Musical-Führer, Bergisch-Gladbach, Bastei-Verlag Gustav H. Lübbe GmbH & Co., May 1998.
 Ruf, Bernd. Phantom of the Opera in Die Musikstunde 9/10, Frankfurt am Main, Verlag Moritz Diesterweg GmbH & Co., 1997.
 Ruf, Bernd. Phantom of the Opera in Musik und Unterricht, Seelze, Friedrich Verlag GmbH& Co., magazine no. 30, January 1995.
 Tango Five. Württembergische Landesbibliothek 2005,

Sources 
 
 Jazzpages.com
 Portrait about Bernd Ruf in the magazine Scala, Stuttgart 2 / 2001

External links 
 Official website
 GermanPops Orchestra
 Tango Five
 JAURENA RUF Project

German male conductors (music)
German jazz clarinetists
Tango in Germany
Baroque musicians
World music musicians
1964 births
Living people
21st-century German conductors (music)
21st-century clarinetists
21st-century German male musicians
German male jazz musicians
Academic staff of the Lübeck Academy of Music
People from Offenburg